Those Without Sin is a 1917 American silent drama film directed by Marshall Neilan, written by Thomas J. Geraghty, George DuBois Proctor and Harvey F. Thew, and starring Blanche Sweet, Tom Forman, Clarence Geldart, Guy Oliver, James Neill, and Charles Ogle. It was released on March 1, 1917, by Paramount Pictures.

Plot

Cast 
Blanche Sweet as Melanie Landry
Tom Forman as Bob Wallace
Clarence Geldart as Richard Landry 
Guy Oliver as Henry Melon
James Neill as Doctor Wallace
Charles Ogle as Colonel Dackens
George Beranger as Chester Wallace
Mabel Van Buren as Estelle Wallace
Dorothy Abril as Grace 
Edna Mae Wilson as Dackin's Daughter
Billy Jacobs as Dackin's Son
Mayme Kelso as Mrs. Wallace

References

External links 
 
 lobby card picture with Blanche Sweet and Tom Forman

1917 films
1910s English-language films
Silent American drama films
1917 drama films
Paramount Pictures films
American black-and-white films
American silent feature films
Films directed by Marshall Neilan
1910s American films